Nessuno mi può giudicare (meaning: "Nobody can judge me") is a 1966 Italian "musicarello" film directed by Ettore Maria Fizzarotti. It is named after the Caterina Caselli's hit song "Nessuno mi può giudicare". It had a sequel titled Perdono released the same year.

Plot 
Federico, having arrived in Rome to look for work, is run over by the director of the Department Stores; he meets him again shortly after, because he has an interview with him, who hires him as an elevator operator.

The boy then meets Laura, the shop assistant, but their love is thwarted by the girl's boss, who is infatuated with her.

Cast 
 Laura Efrikian as Laura 
  Fabrizio Moroni as  Federico 
 Caterina Caselli as  Caterina
 Alberto Terrani as  Alberto 
 Clelia Matania as  Adelina 
 Nino Taranto as  Antonio  
 Gino Bramieri as  Director  
 Vittorio Congia as  Vittorio 
 Wanda Capodaglio as  Laura's Grandma
 Carlo Taranto as  Peppiniello

References

External links

1966 films
Musicarelli
1966 musical comedy films
Films directed by Ettore Maria Fizzarotti
Titanus films
1960s Italian-language films
1960s Italian films